Happy Place is a Canadian drama film, directed by Helen Shaver and released in 2020. An adaptation of the theatrical play by Pamela Mala Sinha, the film centres on a group of women residing at an inpatient mental health clinic after various personal crises.

The film's cast includes Sinha, Clark Backo, Marie-Eve Perron, Tara Rosling, Liisa Repo-Martell, Jennifer Wigmore, Sheila McCarthy and Mary Walsh. The film commenced production in September 2019 in the Parry Sound District, primarily at Lake Rosseau.

The film premiered on September 20, 2020 at the Cinéfest Sudbury International Film Festival, and subsequently screened at the 2020 Vancouver International Film Festival.

Awards and nominations

References

External links

2020 films
2020 drama films
Canadian drama films
English-language Canadian films
Films shot in Ontario
Films based on Canadian plays
2020s English-language films
2020s Canadian films